, also written as 2005 UQ513, is a cubewano with an absolute magnitude of 3.97. Its spectrum has a weak signature of absorption by water ice. Like Quaoar, it has a very red spectrum, which indicates that its surface probably contains many complex, processed organic molecules. Its light curve shows variations of Δm=0.3 mag, but no period has been determined.

Classification 

 has a perihelion of 37.3 AU. The Minor Planet Center (MPC) classifies it as a cubewano while the Deep Ecliptic Survey (DES) classifies it as ScatExt (scattered-extended). Although dynamically it would have been a good candidate to be a member of the Haumea collisional family, given its red spectrum, it is not.

Distance 

As of December 2018, it is currently 48.0 AU from the Sun. It will come to perihelion in 2123.

It has been observed 194 times over 14 oppositions with precovery images back to 1990.

See also
List of gravitationally rounded objects of the Solar System

References

External links 
 (202421) 2005 UQ513 Precovery Images
 

202421
202421
202421
202421
20051021